Coleophora albiochrella is a moth of the family Coleophoridae. It is found in Afghanistan, Iran and Turkey.

References

albiochrella
Moths described in 1967
Moths of Asia